Kiash Nanah (1935/36 – 29 January 2014), better known by her stage name Aïché (Ayşe) Nana, was a Lebanese-born dancer and stripper.

Born in Beirut, Lebanon to Armenian parents, she began her career in 1954, before moving to France then Italy and becoming a belly dancer. She was married to Italian film director and producer and screenwriter Sergio Pastore.

She became a celebrity in Italy, following a famous striptease on 5 November 1958 during a private party at the Rugantino restaurant and nightclub on the Viale di Trastevere in Rome, which caused a national scandal and went on to provide the inspiration for the 'orgy' scene in Federico Fellini's film La dolce vita.

Death
Nana died from cancer on 29 January 2014 at the Aurelia Hospital in Rome, Italy. She was 78.

Filmography

References

External links

1936 births
2014 deaths
Actresses from Beirut
Turkish film actresses
Turkish female dancers
Belly dancers
Turkish female erotic dancers
Deaths from cancer in Lazio
Lebanese emigrants to Italy
Turkish expatriates in France
Turkish expatriates in Italy
Turkish people of Lebanese descent